Clearing the Eye is the first DVD release by the Los Angeles post-metal band Isis.  It features live videos (including an entire live performance), the "In Fiction" music video, photo galleries, lyrics for all songs featured, a complete discography, and a 20-page booklet.

The DVD was originally to include a full documentary of the band, but was removed just prior to its release. According to the DVD's documentarian Seldon Hunt, "[t]he ISIS documentary was shelved at the last minute due to deadlines with Ipecac and some sound quality issues where there was not enough time to resolve before the release came out." This recording, as of 2015, has gone missing.

Track list
All songs written and performed by Isis.

The Troubadour in Los Angeles on November 5, 2005
 "Glisten" – 6:39
 "Weight" – 12:53

CBGB in New York on August 26, 2001
 "Celestial" – 10:38
 "Collapse and Crush" – 6:24

Club Quattro in Tokyo, Japan on February 5, 2005
 "Grinning Mouths" – 9:18

CBGB in New York on June 3, 2001
 "CFT" – 7:23
 "Gentle Time" – 7:26

Annandale Hotel in Sydney, Australia on February 11, 2005
 "Intro" – 0:49
 "So Did We" – 8:38
 "Backlit" – 10:20
 "The Beginning and the End" – 8:42
 "In Fiction" – 10:32
 "Wills Dissolve" – 7:32
 "Grinning Mouths" – 9:49
 "Altered Course" – 16:19
 "From Sinking" – 9:02

Music video
 "In Fiction" – 5:37

Reception

Dave Kerr of The Skinny described it as a “no-frills package without any great technical jiggery pokery,” and that “as a visual spectacle (the bonus promo video for In Fiction notwithstanding) there's little of note going on but a band throwing down onstage. For all the great music on show, the package still smacks of their having been a mate with a camcorder on the tour bus.”

Personnel
 Jeff Caxide – bass guitar
 Aaron Harris – drums
 Michael Gallagher – guitar
 Bryant Clifford Meyer – electronics, guitar
 Aaron Turner – vocals, guitar
 Justin Chancellor – additional sounds/bass guitar on "Weight"
 Troy Zeigler – additional percussion on "Weight"
 Greg Moss – live sound
 Jason Hellman – website design

References

External links
Stonerrock.com release information

Isis (band) video albums
2006 video albums
Live video albums
2006 live albums
Ipecac Recordings live albums
Ipecac Recordings video albums